Deanna Lynne (born December 22, 1970) is a three-time Emmy Award winning American television producer. Born in Daytona Beach, Florida, she is best known for producing children's television programs in the 1990s.

References

American television producers
American women television producers
1970 births
Living people
21st-century American women